Princess Elisa Radziwiłł (Elisa Friederike Luise Martha; ; 28 October 1803 – 27 August 1834) was a member of Polish nobility (of the Radziwiłł family, who were elite magnates), of royal ancestry. She was the desired bride of Prince William of Prussia, who later became William I, German Emperor, but they were not allowed to marry.

Life
Elisa, the daughter of Prince Antoni Radziwiłł and Princess Louise of Prussia, niece of King Frederick the Great and a relative of the Prussian Royal Family, was born in Berlin. Prince William, her second cousin once removed and the heir presumptive of the Prussian throne, met with and fell in love with her.

William was expected to marry and produce further heirs. His father and her kinsman King Frederick William III were fond of the relationship between William and Elisa, but some in the Prussian court had discovered historical allegations that her ancestors had bought their princely title from Maximilian I, Holy Roman Emperor.  In the eyes of certain people, she was not deemed of sufficiently high nobility to marry the heir to the Prussian throne (Radziwiłł was not royal because her father was not a reigning prince), even though a Radziwiłł, Barbara, was the Queen consort of Poland in the 16th century. William's older brother, Frederick William IV of Prussia, was married to Elisabeth Ludovika of Bavaria, and Elisabeth was descended from both Bogusław Radziwiłł and Prince Janusz Radziwiłł.

Thus in 1824, the King of Prussia turned to the childless Emperor Alexander I of Russia to adopt Radziwiłł, but the Russian ruler declined.  The second adoption plan by Radziwiłł's uncle, Prince Augustus of Prussia, likewise failed as the responsible committee considered that adoption "does not alter the blood" (a principle which governs noble and royal connections to the present day).  Another factor was the influence of the Mecklenburg kinsmen of the deceased Queen Louise in the German and Russian courts who were not fond of Radziwiłł's father and opposed the possible marriage.

Eventually, in June 1826, William's father was obligated to demand the renunciation of a potential marriage to Radziwiłł. William spent the next few months looking for a more suitable bride, but did not relinquish his emotional ties to Radziwiłł. Eventually, William asked for the hand of Augusta of Saxe-Weimar, fourteen years his junior, in marriage on 29 August 1826 (in writing and through the intervention of his father). William saw his cousin Elisa for the last time in 1829.

Radziwiłł was later engaged to Prince Friedrich of Schwarzenberg, but the engagement failed.  She died, unmarried, in Bad Freienwalde in 1834 of tuberculosis while at a spa seeking a cure.

Historian Karin Feuerstein-Prasser has pointed out, on the basis of evaluations of the correspondence between both fiancées, the different expectations Wilhelm had of both marriages: he wrote to his sister, Czarina Alexandra Feodorovna (Charlotte of Prussia), wife of Czar Nicholas I of Russia, regarding Radziwiłł, that "One can love only once in life, really", but confessed regarding Augusta that "the princess is nice and clever, but she leaves me cold." Though Augusta was in love with her future husband and hoped for a happy marriage, theirs was a troubled relationship; Radziwiłł was aware of this, and she believed that she herself would have been a better wife to the Prussian prince.

Ancestry

References

Sources

External links

1803 births
1834 deaths
People from Berlin
Elisa
German people of Polish descent
Polish people of German descent